August Wolfinger (born 5 November 1949) is a Liechtensteiner former alpine skier who competed in the 1964 Winter Olympics.

References

External links
 

1949 births
Living people
Liechtenstein male alpine skiers
Olympic alpine skiers of Liechtenstein
Alpine skiers at the 1964 Winter Olympics